This is a list of the bird species recorded in Lesotho. The avifauna of Lesotho included a total of 361 species, as of October 2022, according to Avibase. Four species have been introduced by humans, and the statuses of six are under review.

This list's taxonomic treatment (designation and sequence of orders, families and species) and nomenclature (English and scientific names) are those of The Clements Checklist of Birds of the World, 2022 edition.

The following tags have been used to highlight several categories of occurrence

(A) Accidental - a species that rarely or accidentally occurs in Lesotho
(I) Introduced - a species introduced to Lesotho as a consequence, direct or indirect, of human actions
(Ex) Extirpated - a species that no longer occurs in Lesotho although populations exist elsewhere
(S) Status - a species whose status is under review

Ducks, geese, and waterfowl
Order: AnseriformesFamily: Anatidae

Anatidae includes the ducks and most duck-like waterfowl, such as geese and swans. These birds are adapted to an aquatic existence with webbed feet, flattened bills, and feathers that are excellent at shedding water due to an oily coating.

White-faced whistling-duck, Dendrocygna viduata
Fulvous whistling-duck, Dendrocygna bicolor (A)
White-backed duck, Thalassornis leuconotus
Knob-billed duck, Sarkidiornis melanotos
Egyptian goose, Alopochen aegyptiacus
South African shelduck, Tadorna cana
Spur-winged goose, Plectropterus gambensis
African pygmy-goose, Nettapus auritus 
Blue-billed teal, Spatula hottentota (A)
Cape shoveler, Spatula smithii
African black duck, Anas sparsa
Yellow-billed duck, Anas undulata
Cape teal, Anas capensis (A)
Red-billed duck, Anas erythrorhyncha
Southern pochard, Netta erythrophthalma (A)
Maccoa duck, Oxyura maccoa

Guineafowl
Order: GalliformesFamily: Numididae

Guineafowl are a group of African, seed-eating, ground-nesting birds that resemble partridges, but with featherless heads and spangled grey plumage.

Helmeted guineafowl, Numida meleagris

Pheasants, grouse, and allies
Order: GalliformesFamily: Phasianidae

The Phasianidae are a family of terrestrial birds which consists of quails, partridges, snowcocks, francolins, spurfowl, tragopans, monals, pheasants, peafowl, and jungle fowl. In general, they are plump (although they vary in size) and have broad, relatively short wings.

Red-winged francolin, Scleroptila levaillantii
Gray-winged francolin, Scleroptila africanus
Orange River francolin, Scleroptila gutturalis
Common quail, Coturnix coturnix
Harlequin quail, Coturnix delegorguei (A)
Swainson's francolin, Pternistis swainsonii

Flamingos
Order: PhoenicopteriformesFamily: Phoenicopteridae

Flamingos filter-feed on shellfish and algae. Their oddly shaped beaks are specially adapted to separate mud and silt from the food they consume and, uniquely, are used upside-down.

Greater flamingo, Phoenicopterus roseus
Lesser flamingo, Phoeniconaias minor

Grebes
Order: PodicipediformesFamily: Podicipedidae

Grebes are small to medium-large freshwater diving birds. They have lobed toes and are excellent swimmers and divers. However, they have their feet placed far back on the body, making them quite ungainly on land.

Little grebe, Tachybaptus ruficollis
Great crested grebe, Podiceps cristatus (A)
Eared grebe, Podiceps nigricollis

Pigeons and doves
Order: ColumbiformesFamily: Columbidae

Pigeons and doves are stout-bodied birds with short necks and short slender bills with a fleshy cere.

Rock pigeon, Columba livia (I)
Speckled pigeon, Columba guinea
Rameron pigeon, Columba arquatrix
Red-eyed dove, Streptopelia semitorquata
Ring-necked dove, Streptopelia capicola
Laughing dove, Streptopelia senegalensis
Namaqua dove, Oena capensis

Sandgrouse
Order: PterocliformesFamily: Pteroclidae

Sandgrouse have small, pigeon-like heads and necks, but sturdy compact bodies. They have long pointed wings and sometimes tails and a fast direct flight. Flocks fly to watering holes at dawn and dusk. Their legs are feathered down to the toes.
 
Namaqua sandgrouse, Pterocles namaqua (A)

Bustards
Order: OtidiformesFamily: Otididae

Bustards are large terrestrial birds mainly associated with dry open country and steppes in the Old World. They are omnivorous and nest on the ground. They walk steadily on strong legs and big toes, pecking for food as they go. They have long broad wings with "fingered" wingtips and striking patterns in flight. Many have interesting mating displays.

Kori bustard, Ardeotis kori
Ludwig's bustard, Neotis ludwigii
Denham's bustard, Neotis denhami (A)
White-bellied bustard, Eupodotis senegalensis
Blue bustard, Eupodotis caerulescens
Karoo bustard, Eupodotis vigorsii
White-quilled bustard, Eupodoti afraoides

Cuckoos
Order: CuculiformesFamily: Cuculidae

The family Cuculidae includes cuckoos, roadrunners, and anis. These birds are of variable size with slender bodies, long tails, and strong legs. The Old World cuckoos are brood parasites.

White-browed coucal, Centropus superciliosus (A)
Great spotted cuckoo, Clamator glandarius
Pied cuckoo, Clamator jacobinus
Dideric cuckoo, Chrysococcyx caprius
Black cuckoo, Cuculus clamosus (A)
Red-chested cuckoo, Cuculus solitarius
Common cuckoo, Cuculus canorus (A)

Nightjars and allies
Order: CaprimulgiformesFamily: Caprimulgidae

Nightjars are medium-sized nocturnal birds that usually nest on the ground. They have long wings, short legs, and very short bills. Most have small feet, of little use for walking, and long pointed wings. Their soft plumage is camouflaged to resemble bark or leaves.

Eurasian nightjar, Caprimulgus europaeus (A)
Freckled nightjar, Caprimulgus tristigma
Square-tailed nightjar, Caprimulgus fossii (A)

Swifts
Order: CaprimulgiformesFamily: Apodidae

Swifts are small birds which spend the majority of their lives flying. These birds have very short legs and never settle voluntarily on the ground, perching instead only on vertical surfaces. Many swifts have long swept-back wings which resemble a crescent or boomerang.

Alpine swift, Apus melba
Common swift, Apus apus
African swift, Apus barbatus (S)
Little swift, Apus affinis
Horus swift, Apus horus
White-rumped swift, Apus caffer

Flufftails
Order: GruiformesFamily: Sarothruridae

The flufftails are a small family of ground-dwelling birds found only in Madagascar and sub-Saharan Africa.

Striped flufftail, Sarothrura affinis

Rails, gallinules, and coots
Order: GruiformesFamily: Rallidae

Rallidae is a large family of small to medium-sized birds which includes the rails, crakes, coots, and gallinules. Typically they inhabit dense vegetation in damp environments near lakes, swamps, or rivers. In general they are shy and secretive birds, making them difficult to observe. Most species have strong legs and long toes which are well adapted to soft uneven surfaces. They tend to have short, rounded wings and to be weak fliers.

African rail, Rallus caerulescens
Corn crake, Crex crex (A)
African crake, Crex egregia
Spotted crake, Porzana porzana
Lesser moorhen, Paragallinula angulata 
Eurasian moorhen, Gallinula chloropus
Red-knobbed coot, Fulica cristata
Allen's gallinule, Porphyrio alleni
African swamphen, Porphyrio madagascariensis
Baillon's crake, Porzana pusilla

Cranes
Order: GruiformesFamily: Gruidae

Cranes are large, long-legged, and long-necked birds. Unlike the similar-looking but unrelated herons, cranes fly with necks outstretched, not pulled back. Most have elaborate and noisy courting displays or "dances".

Gray crowned-crane, Balearica regulorum (A)
Blue crane, Anthropoides paradisea (A)
Wattled crane, Bugeranus carunculatus (A)

Thick-knees
Order: CharadriiformesFamily: Burhinidae

The thick-knees are a group of waders found worldwide within the tropical zone, with some species also breeding in temperate Europe and Australia. They are medium to large waders with strong black or yellow-black bills, large yellow eyes, and cryptic plumage. Despite being classed as waders, most species have a preference for arid or semi-arid habitats.

Spotted thick-knee, Burhinus capensis

Stilts and avocets
Order: CharadriiformesFamily: Recurvirostridae

Recurvirostridae is a family of large wading birds which includes the avocets and stilts. The avocets have long legs and long up-curved bills. The stilts have extremely long legs and long, thin, straight bills.

Black-winged stilt, Himantopus himantopus
Pied avocet, Recurvirostra avosetta (A)

Plovers and lapwings
Order: CharadriiformesFamily: Charadriidae

The family Charadriidae includes the plovers, dotterels, and lapwings. They are small to medium-sized birds with compact bodies, short thick necks, and long, usually pointed, wings. They are found in open country worldwide, mostly in habitats near water.

Black-bellied plover, Pluvialis squatarola
Blacksmith lapwing, Vanellus armatus
Black-winged lapwing, Vanellus melanopterus
Crowned lapwing, Vanellus coronatus (A)
Wattled lapwing, Vanellus senegallus
Kittlitz's plover, Charadrius pecuarius
Common ringed plover, Charadrius hiaticula (A)
Three-banded plover, Charadrius tricollaris

Painted-snipes
Order: CharadriiformesFamily: Rostratulidae

Painted-snipes are short-legged, long-billed birds similar in shape to the true snipes, but more brightly coloured.

Greater painted-snipe, Rostratula benghalensis

Jacanas
Order: CharadriiformesFamily: Jacanidae

The jacanas are a group of waders found throughout the tropics. They are identifiable by their huge feet and claws which enable them to walk on floating vegetation in the shallow lakes that are their preferred habitat.

African jacana, Actophilornis africanus

Sandpipers and allies
Order: CharadriiformesFamily: Scolopacidae

Scolopacidae is a large diverse family of small to medium-sized shorebirds including the sandpipers, curlews, godwits, shanks, tattlers, woodcocks, snipes, dowitchers, and phalaropes. The majority of these species eat small invertebrates picked out of the mud or soil. Variation in length of legs and bills enables multiple species to feed in the same habitat, particularly on the coast, without direct competition for food.

Eurasian curlew, Numenius arquata (A)
Ruddy turnstone, Arenaria interpres (A)
Ruff, Calidris pugnax
Curlew sandpiper, Calidris ferruginea (A)
Little stint, Calidris minuta
African snipe, Gallinago nigripennis
Common sandpiper, Actitis hypoleucos
Common greenshank, Tringa nebularia
Marsh sandpiper, Tringa stagnatilis (A)
Wood sandpiper, Tringa glareola

Buttonquails
Order: CharadriiformesFamily: Turnicidae

The buttonquails are small, drab, running birds which resemble the true quails. The female is the brighter of the sexes and initiates courtship. The male incubates the eggs and tends the young.

Small buttonquail, Turnix sylvaticus (A)

Pratincoles and coursers
Order: CharadriiformesFamily: Glareolidae

Glareolidae is a family of wading birds comprising the pratincoles, which have short legs, long pointed wings, and long forked tails, and the coursers, which have long legs, short wings, and long, pointed bills which curve downwards.

Burchell's courser, Cursorius rufus
Temminck's courser, Cursorius temminckii
Double-banded courser, Smutsornis africanus
Collared pratincole, Glareola pratincola (A)
Black-winged pratincole, Glareola nordmanni

Gulls, terns, and skimmers
Order: CharadriiformesFamily: Laridae

Laridae is a family of medium to large seabirds, the gulls, terns, and skimmers. Gulls are typically grey or white, often with black markings on the head or wings. They have stout, longish bills and webbed feet. Terns are a group of generally medium to large seabirds typically with grey or white plumage, often with black markings on the head. Most terns hunt fish by diving but some pick insects off the surface of fresh water. Terns are generally long-lived birds, with several species known to live in excess of 30 years.

Gray-hooded gull, Chroicocephalus cirrocephalus (A)
White-winged tern, Chlidonias leucopterus (A)
Whiskered tern, Chlidonias hybrida (A)

Storks
Order: CiconiiformesFamily: Ciconiidae

Storks are large, long-legged, long-necked wading birds with long, stout bills. Storks are mute, but bill-clattering is an important mode of communication at the nest. Their nests can be large and may be reused for many years. Many species are migratory.

Black stork, Ciconia nigra
Abdim's stork, Ciconia abdimii
White stork, Ciconia ciconia
Yellow-billed stork, Mycteria ibis

Anhingas
Order: SuliformesFamily: Anhingidae

Anhingas or darters are often called "snake-birds" because of their long thin neck, which gives a snake-like appearance when they swim with their bodies submerged. The males have black and dark-brown plumage, an erectile crest on the nape and a larger bill than the female. The females have much paler plumage especially on the neck and underparts. The darters have completely webbed feet and their legs are short and set far back on the body. Their plumage is somewhat permeable, like that of cormorants, and they spread their wings to dry after diving.

African darter, Anhinga rufa

Cormorants and shags
Order: SuliformesFamily: Phalacrocoracidae

Phalacrocoracidae is a family of medium to large fish-eating waterbirds that includes cormorants and shags. Plumage colouration varies, with the majority having mainly dark plumage, some species being black-and-white, and a few being colourful.

Long-tailed cormorant, Microcarbo africanus
Great cormorant, Phalacrocorax carbo (S)

Hamerkop
Order: PelecaniformesFamily: Scopidae

The hamerkop is a medium-sized bird with a long shaggy crest. The shape of its head with a curved bill and crest at the back is reminiscent of a hammer, hence its name. Its plumage is drab-brown all over.

Hamerkop, Scopus umbretta

Herons, egrets, and bitterns
Order: PelecaniformesFamily: Ardeidae

The family Ardeidae contains the bitterns, herons, and egrets. Herons and egrets are medium to large wading birds with long necks and legs. Bitterns tend to be shorter necked and more wary. Members of Ardeidae fly with their necks retracted, unlike other long-necked birds such as storks, ibises, and spoonbills.

Great bittern, Botaurus stellaris
Little bittern, Ixobrychus minutus (A)
Gray heron, Ardea cinerea
Black-headed heron, Ardea melanocephala
Goliath heron, Ardea goliath
Purple heron, Ardea purpurea
Great egret, Ardea alba
Intermediate egret, Ardea intermedia (A)
Little egret, Egretta garzetta (S)
Cattle egret, Bubulcus ibis
Squacco heron, Ardeola ralloides (A)
Rufous-bellied heron, Ardeola rufiventris
Black-crowned night-heron, Nycticorax nycticorax

Ibises and spoonbills
Order: PelecaniformesFamily: Threskiornithidae

Threskiornithidae is a family of large terrestrial and wading birds which includes the ibises and spoonbills. They have long, broad wings with 11 primary and about 20 secondary feathers. They are strong fliers and despite their size and weight, very capable soarers.

Glossy ibis, Plegadis falcinellus (A)
African sacred ibis, Threskiornis aethiopicus
Southern bald ibis, Geronticus calvus (A)
Hadada ibis, Bostrychia hagedash
African spoonbill, Platalea alba

Secretarybird
Order: AccipitriformesFamily: Sagittariidae

The secretarybird is a bird of prey but is easily distinguished from other raptors by its long crane-like legs.

Secretarybird, Sagittarius serpentarius

Osprey
Order: AccipitriformesFamily: Pandionidae

The family Pandionidae contains only one species, the osprey. The osprey is a medium-large raptor which is a specialist fish-eater with a worldwide distribution.

Osprey, Pandion haliaetus

Hawks, eagles, and kites
Order: AccipitriformesFamily: Accipitridae

Accipitridae is a family of birds of prey which includes hawks, eagles, kites, harriers, and Old World vultures. These birds have powerful hooked beaks for tearing flesh from their prey, strong legs, powerful talons, and keen eyesight.

Black-winged kite, Elanus caeruleus
African harrier-hawk, Polyboroides typus
Palm-nut vulture, Gypohierax angolensis (A)
Bearded vulture, Gypaetus barbatus
Egyptian vulture, Neophron percnopterus (A)
Cape griffon, Gyps coprotheres
Bateleur, Terathopius ecaudatus (A)
Black-chested snake-eagle, Circaetus pectoralis (A)
Long-crested eagle, Lophaetus occipitalis (A)
Booted eagle, Hieraaetus pennatus
Tawny eagle, Aquila rapax (A)
Verreaux's eagle, Aquila verreauxii
African hawk-eagle, Aquila spilogaster
Pale chanting-goshawk, Melierax canorus (A)
Gabar goshawk, Micronisus gabar (A)
African marsh-harrier, Circus ranivorus
Black harrier, Circus maurus
Pallid harrier, Circus macrourus (A)
Montagu's harrier, Circus pygargus
African goshawk, Accipiter tachiro
Shikra, Accipiter badius (A)
Little sparrowhawk, Accipiter minullus (A)
Rufous-breasted sparrowhawk, Accipiter rufiventris
Black goshawk, Accipiter melanoleucus (A)
Black kite, Milvus migrans (S)
African fish-eagle, Haliaeetus vocifer
Common buzzard, Buteo buteo
Jackal buzzard, Buteo rufofuscus

Barn-owls
Order: StrigiformesFamily: Tytonidae

Barn-owls are medium to large owls with large heads and characteristic heart-shaped faces. They have long strong legs with powerful talons.

African grass-owl, Tyto capensis
Barn owl, Tyto alba

Owls
Order: StrigiformesFamily: Strigidae

The typical owls are small to large solitary nocturnal birds of prey. They have large forward-facing eyes and ears, a hawk-like beak, and a conspicuous circle of feathers around each eye called a facial disk.

African scops-owl, Otus senegalensis (A)
Cape eagle-owl, Bubo capensis (A)
Spotted eagle-owl, Bubo africanus
Verreaux's eagle-owl, Bubo lacteus (Ex)
Marsh owl, Asio capensis

Mousebirds
Order: ColiiformesFamily: Coliidae

The mousebirds are slender greyish or brown birds with soft, hairlike body feathers and very long thin tails. They are arboreal and scurry through the leaves like rodents in search of berries, fruit and buds. They are acrobatic and can feed upside down. All species have strong claws and reversible outer toes. They also have crests and stubby bills.

Speckled mousebird, Colius striatus
White-backed mousebird, Colius colius (A)
Red-faced mousebird, Urocolius indicus

Trogons
Order: TrogoniformesFamily: Trogonidae

The family Trogonidae includes trogons and quetzals. Found in tropical woodlands worldwide, they feed on insects and fruit, and their broad bills and weak legs reflect their diet and arboreal habits. Although their flight is fast, they are reluctant to fly any distance. Trogons have soft, often colourful, feathers with distinctive male and female plumage.

Narina trogon, Apaloderma narina

Hoopoes
Order: CoraciiformesFamily: Upupidae

Hoopoes have black, white, and orangey-pink colouring with a large erectile crest on their head.

Eurasian hoopoe, Upupa epops

Woodhoopoes and scimitarbills
Order: BucerotiformesFamily: Phoeniculidae

The woodhoopoes and scimitarbills are related to the hoopoes, ground-hornbills, and hornbills. They most resemble the hoopoes with their long curved bills, used to probe for insects, and short rounded wings. However, they differ in that they have metallic plumage, often blue, green, or purple, and lack an erectile crest.

Green woodhoopoe, Phoeniculus purpureus (A)

Kingfishers
Order: CoraciiformesFamily: Alcedinidae

Kingfishers are medium-sized birds with large heads, long pointed bills, short legs, and stubby tails.

Malachite kingfisher, Corythornis cristatus
Giant kingfisher, Megaceryle maximus
Pied kingfisher, Ceryle rudis

Bee-eaters
Order: CoraciiformesFamily: Meropidae

The bee-eaters are a group of near passerine birds in the family Meropidae. Most species are found in Africa but others occur in southern Europe, Madagascar, Australia, and New Guinea. They are characterised by richly coloured plumage, slender bodies, and usually elongated central tail feathers. They have long downturned bills and pointed wings, which give them a swallow-like appearance when seen from afar.

White-fronted bee-eater, Merops bullockoides (A)
European bee-eater, Merops apiaster

Rollers
Order: CoraciiformesFamily: Coraciidae

Rollers resemble crows in size and build, but are more closely related to the kingfishers and bee-eaters. They share the colourful appearance of those groups with blues and browns predominating. The two inner front toes are connected, but the outer toe is not.

European roller, Coracias garrulus
Lilac-breasted roller, Coracias caudatus

African barbets
Order: PiciformesFamily: Lybiidae

The barbets are plump birds, with short necks and large heads. They get their name from the bristles which fringe their heavy bills. Most species are brightly coloured.

Crested barbet, Trachyphonus vaillantii
Red-fronted tinkerbird, Pogoniulus pusillus
Pied barbet, Tricholaema leucomelas
Black-collared barbet, Lybius torquatus (A)

Honeyguides
Order: PiciformesFamily: Indicatoridae

Honeyguides are among the few birds that feed on wax. They are named for the greater honeyguide which leads traditional honey-hunters to bees' nests and, after the hunters have harvested the honey, feeds on the remaining contents of the hive.

Wahlberg's honeyguide, Prodotiscus regulus
Lesser honeyguide, Indicator minor (A)
Greater honeyguide, Indicator indicator (A)

Woodpeckers
Order: PiciformesFamily: Picidae

Woodpeckers are small to medium-sized birds with chisel-like beaks, short legs, stiff tails, and long tongues used for capturing insects. Some species have feet with two toes pointing forward and two backward, while several species have only three toes. Many woodpeckers have the habit of tapping noisily on tree trunks with their beaks.

Rufous-necked wryneck, Jynx ruficollis (A)
Cardinal woodpecker, Chloropicus fuscescens
Ground woodpecker, Geocolaptes olivaceus

Falcons and caracaras
Order: FalconiformesFamily: Falconidae

Falconidae is a family of diurnal birds of prey. They differ from hawks, eagles, and kites in that they kill with their beaks instead of their talons.

Lesser kestrel, Falco naumanni
Rock kestrel, Falco rupicolus
Greater kestrel, Falco rupicoloides
Red-footed falcon, Falco vespertinus
Amur falcon, Falco amurensis
Eurasian hobby, Falco subbuteo (A)
Lanner falcon, Falco biarmicus
Peregrine falcon, Falco peregrinus

Old World orioles
Order: PasseriformesFamily: Oriolidae

The Old World orioles are colourful passerine birds. They are not related to the New World orioles though they appear similar.

Eurasian golden oriole, Oriolus oriolus
African black-headed oriole, Oriolus larvatus (A)

Wattle-eyes and batises
Order: PasseriformesFamily: Platysteiridae

The wattle-eyes, or puffback flycatchers, are small stout passerine birds of the African tropics. They get their name from the brightly coloured fleshy eye decorations found in most species in this group.

Cape batis, Batis capensis
Chinspot batis, Batis molitor

Bushshrikes and allies
Order: PasseriformesFamily: Malaconotidae

Bushshrikes are similar in habits to shrikes, hunting insects and other small prey from a perch on a bush. Although similar in build to the shrikes, these tend to be either colourful species or largely black; some species are quite secretive.

Black-backed puffback, Dryoscopus cubla (A)
Southern boubou, Laniarius ferrugineus
Bokmakierie, Telophorus zeylonus

Drongos
Order: PasseriformesFamily: Dicruridae

The drongos are mostly black or dark grey in colour, sometimes with metallic tints. They have long forked tails, and some Asian species have elaborate tail decorations. They have short legs and sit very upright when perched, like a shrike. They flycatch or take prey from the ground.

Fork-tailed drongo, Dicrurus adsimilis

Monarch flycatchers
Order: PasseriformesFamily: Monarchidae

The monarch flycatchers are small to medium-sized insectivorous passerines which hunt by flycatching.

African paradise-flycatcher, Terpsiphone viridis

Shrikes
Order: PasseriformesFamily: Laniidae

Shrikes are passerine birds known for their habit of catching other birds and small animals and impaling the uneaten portions of their bodies on thorns. A shrike's beak is hooked, like that of a typical bird of prey.

Red-backed shrike, Lanius collurio
Lesser gray shrike, Lanius minor (A)
Southern fiscal, Lanius collaris

Crows, jays, and magpies
Order: PasseriformesFamily: Corvidae

The family Corvidae includes crows, ravens, jays, choughs, magpies, treepies, nutcrackers, and ground jays. Corvids are above average in size among the Passeriformes, and some of the larger species show high levels of intelligence.

Cape crow, Corvus capensis
Pied crow, Corvus albus
White-necked raven, Corvus albicollis

Rockjumpers
Order: PasseriformesFamily: Chaetopidae

This species is one of only two in its family; both are endemic to far southern Africa.

Drakensberg rockjumper, Chaetops aurantius

Fairy flycatchers
Order: PasseriformesFamily: Stenostiridae

Most of the species of this small family are found in Africa, though a few inhabit tropical Asia. They are not closely related to other birds called "flycatchers".

Fairy flycatcher, Stenostira scita

Tits, chickadees, and titmice
Order: PasseriformesFamily: Paridae

The Paridae are mainly small stocky woodland species with short stout bills. Some have crests. They are adaptable birds, with a mixed diet including seeds and insects.

Ashy tit, Melaniparus cinerascens
Gray tit, Melaniparus afer

Larks
Order: PasseriformesFamily: Alaudidae

Larks are small terrestrial birds with often extravagant songs and display flights. Most larks are fairly dull in appearance. Their food is insects and seeds.

Spike-heeled lark, Chersomanes albofasciata (A)
Eastern long-billed lark, Certhilauda semitorquata
Chestnut-backed sparrow-lark, Eremopterix leucotis 
Gray-backed sparrow-lark, Eremopterix verticalis (A)
Rudd's lark, Heteromirafra ruddi (A)
Cape clapper lark, Mirafra apiata
Rufous-naped lark, Mirafra africana
Red-capped lark, Calandrella cinerea
Pink-billed lark, Spizocorys conirostris (A)
Large-billed lark, Galerida magnirostris

African warblers
Order: PasseriformesFamily: Macrosphenidae

African warblers are small to medium-sized insectivores which are found in a wide variety of habitats south of the Sahara.

Cape crombec, Sylvietta rufescens (A)
Cape grassbird, Sphenoeacus afer

Cisticolas and allies
Order: PasseriformesFamily: Cisticolidae

The Cisticolidae are warblers found mainly in warmer southern regions of the Old World. They are generally very small birds of drab brown or grey appearance found in open country such as grassland or scrub.

Yellow-bellied eremomela, Eremomela icteropygialis
Namaqua warbler, Phragmacia substriata (A)
Bar-throated apalis, Apalis thoracica
Yellow-breasted apalis, Apalis flavida
Tawny-flanked prinia, Prinia subflava (A)
Black-chested prinia, Prinia flavicans (A)
Karoo prinia, Prinia maculosa
Drakensberg prinia, Prinia hypoxantha
Rock-loving cisticola, Cisticola aberrans
Wailing cisticola, Cisticola lais
Levaillant's cisticola, Cisticola tinniens
Piping cisticola, Cisticola fulvicapillus
Zitting cisticola, Cisticola juncidis
Desert cisticola, Cisticola aridulus
Cloud cisticola, Cisticola textrix
Wing-snapping cisticola, Cisticola ayresii

Reed warblers and allies
Order: PasseriformesFamily: Acrocephalidae

The members of this family are usually rather large for "warblers". Most are rather plain olivaceous brown above with much yellow to beige below. They are usually found in open woodland, reedbeds, or tall grass. The family occurs mostly in southern to western Eurasia and surroundings, but it also ranges far into the Pacific, with some species in  Africa.

African yellow-warbler, Iduna natalensis
Sedge warbler, Acrocephalus schoenobaenus
Common reed warbler, Acrocephalus scirpaceus
Lesser swamp warbler, Acrocephalus gracilirostris
Great reed warbler, Acrocephalus arundinaceus

Grassbirds and allies
Order: PasseriformesFamily: Locustellidae

Locustellidae are a family of small insectivorous songbirds found mainly in Eurasia, Africa, and the Australian region. They are smallish birds with tails that are usually long and pointed, and tend to be drab brownish or buffy all over.

Barratt's warbler, Bradypterus barratti
Little rush warbler, Bradypterus baboecala

Swallows
Order: PasseriformesFamily: Hirundinidae

The family Hirundinidae is adapted to aerial feeding. They have a slender streamlined body, long pointed wings, and a short bill with a wide gape. The feet are adapted to perching rather than walking, and the front toes are partially joined at the base.

Plain martin, Riparia paludicola
Bank swallow, Riparia riparia (A)
Banded martin, Neophedina cincta
Rock martin, Ptyonoprogne fuligula
Barn swallow, Hirundo rustica
White-throated swallow, Hirundo albigularis
Pearl-breasted swallow, Hirundo dimidiata
Montane blue swallow, Hirundo atrocaerulea
Greater striped swallow, Cecropis cucullata
Lesser striped swallow, Cecropis abyssinica
Rufous-chested swallow, Cecropis semirufa (A)
South African swallow, Petrochelidon spilodera (A)
Common house-martin, Delichon urbicum
Black sawwing, Psalidoprocne pristoptera (A)

Bulbuls
Order: PasseriformesFamily: Pycnonotidae

Bulbuls are medium-sized songbirds. Some are colourful with yellow, red or orange vents, cheeks, throats or supercilia, but most are drab, with uniform olive-brown to black plumage. Some species have distinct crests.

Common bulbul, Pycnonotus barbatus
Black-fronted bulbul, Pycnonotus nigricans

Leaf warblers
Order: PasseriformesFamily: Phylloscopidae

Leaf warblers are a family of small insectivorous birds found mostly in Eurasia and ranging into Wallacea and Africa. The species are of various sizes, often green-plumaged above and yellow below, or more subdued with greyish-green to greyish-brown colours.

Willow warbler, Phylloscopus trochilus

Sylviid warblers, parrotbills, and allies 
Order: PasseriformesFamily: Sylviidae

The family Sylviidae ("Old World warblers") is a group of small insectivorous passerine birds. They mainly occur as breeding species, as one common name implies, in Europe, Asia, and, to a lesser extent, Africa. Most are of generally undistinguished appearance, but many have distinctive songs.

Garden warbler, Sylvia borin (A)
Bush blackcap, Sylvia nigricapilla
Layard's warbler, Curruca layardi
Chestnut-vented warbler, Curruca subcoerulea (A)
Greater whitethroat, Curruca communis (A)

White-eyes, yuhinas, and allies
Order: PasseriformesFamily: Zosteropidae

The white-eyes are small and mostly undistinguished, their plumage above being generally some dull colour like greenish-olive, but some species have a white or bright yellow throat, breast, or lower parts, and several have buff flanks. As their name suggests, many species have a white ring around each eye.

Orange River white-eye, Zosterops pallidus
Cape white-eye, Zosterops virens

Starlings
Order: PasseriformesFamily: Sturnidae

Starlings are small to medium-sized passerine birds. Their flight is strong and direct and they are very gregarious. Their preferred habitat is fairly open country. They eat insects and fruit. Plumage is typically dark with a metallic sheen.

European starling, Sturnus vulgaris (I)
Wattled starling, Creatophora cinerea
Common myna, Acridotheres tristis (I)
Violet-backed starling, Cinnyricinclus leucogaster (A)
Pale-winged starling, Onychognathus nabouroup
Red-winged starling, Onychognathus morio
African pied starling, Lamprotornis bicolor
Cape starling, Lamprotornis nitens

Thrushes and allies
Order: PasseriformesFamily: Turdidae

The thrushes are a group of passerine birds that occur mainly in the Old World. They are plump, soft plumaged, small to medium-sized insectivores or sometimes omnivores, often feeding on the ground. Many have attractive songs.

Kurrichane thrush, Turdus libonyana (A)
Olive thrush, Turdus olivaceus
Karoo thrush, Turdus smithi

Old World flycatchers
Order: PasseriformesFamily: Muscicapidae

Old World flycatchers are a large group of small passerine birds native to the Old World. They are mainly small arboreal insectivores. The appearance of these birds is highly varied, but they mostly have weak songs and harsh calls.

African dusky flycatcher, Muscicapa adusta (A)
Spotted flycatcher, Muscicapa striata
Fiscal flycatcher, Melaenornis silens (A)
Karoo scrub-robin, Cercotrichas coryphaeus (A)
Cape robin-chat, Cossypha caffra
Sentinel rock-thrush, Monticola explorator
Cape rock-thrush, Monticola rupestris
African stonechat, Saxicola torquatus
Buff-streaked chat, Campicoloises bifasciatus (A)
Sickle-winged chat, Emarginata sinuata
Mocking cliff-chat, Thamnolaea cinnamomeiventris (A)
Southern anteater-chat, Myrmecocichla formicivora (A)
Mountain wheatear, Myrmecocichla monticola
Capped wheatear, Oenanthe pileata
Familiar chat, Oenanthe familiaris

Sugarbirds
Order: PasseriformesFamily: Promeropidae

The two species in this family are restricted to southern Africa. They have brownish plumage, a long downcurved bill, and long tail feathers.

Gurney's sugarbird, Promerops gurneyi

Sunbirds and spiderhunters
Order: PasseriformesFamily: Nectariniidae

The sunbirds and spiderhunters are very small passerine birds which feed largely on nectar, although they will also take insects, especially when feeding young. Flight is fast and direct on their short wings. Most species can take nectar by hovering like a hummingbird, but usually perch to feed.

Collared sunbird, Hedydipna collaris (A)
Amethyst sunbird, Chalcomitra amethystina
Malachite sunbird, Nectarinia famosa
Southern double-collared sunbird, Cinnyris chalybeus
Greater double-collared sunbird, Cinnyris afer
White-breasted sunbird, Cinnyris talatala

Weavers and allies
Order: PasseriformesFamily: Ploceidae

The weavers are small passerine birds related to the finches. They are seed-eating birds with rounded conical bills. The males of many species are brightly coloured, usually in red or yellow and black, though some species show variation in colour only in the breeding season.

White-browed sparrow-weaver, Plocepasser mahali (A)
Spectacled weaver, Ploceus ocularis (A)
Cape weaver, Ploceus capensis
Southern masked-weaver, Ploceus velatus
Village weaver, Ploceus cucullatus
Red-billed quelea, Quelea quelea
Southern red bishop, Euplectes orix
Yellow-crowned bishop, Euplectes afer
Yellow bishop, Euplectes capensis
White-winged widowbird, Euplectes albonotatus
Red-collared widowbird, Euplectes ardens
Fan-tailed widowbird, Euplectes axillaris (A)
Long-tailed widowbird, Euplectes progne

Waxbills and allies
Order: PasseriformesFamily: Estrildidae

The estrildid finches are small passerine birds of the Old World tropics and Australasia. They are gregarious and often colonial seed eaters with short thick but pointed bills. They are all similar in structure and habits, but have wide variation in plumage colours and patterns.

Swee waxbill, Coccopygia melanotis
Common waxbill, Estrilda astrild
Quailfinch, Ortygospiza fuscocrissa
Red-headed finch, Amadina erythrocephala
Zebra waxbill, Amandava subflava
Red-billed firefinch, Lagonosticta senegala (A)

Indigobirds
Order: PasseriformesFamily: Viduidae

The indigobirds are finch-like species which usually have black or indigo predominating in their plumage. All are brood parasites which lay their eggs in the nests of estrildid finches.

Pin-tailed whydah, Vidua macroura
Village indigobird, Vidua chalybeata
Parasitic weaver, Anomalospiza imberbis

Old World sparrows
Order: PasseriformesFamily: Passeridae

Sparrows are small passerine birds. In general, sparrows tend to be small, plump, brown, or grey birds with short tails and short powerful beaks. Sparrows are seed eaters, but they also consume small insects.

House sparrow, Passer domesticus (I)
Great rufous sparrow, Passer motitensis
Cape sparrow, Passer melanurus
Southern gray-headed sparrow, Passer diffusus
Yellow-throated bush sparrow, Gymnoris superciliaris

Wagtails and pipits
Order: PasseriformesFamily: Motacillidae

Motacillidae is a family of small passerine birds with medium to long tails. They are slender ground-feeding insectivores of open country.

Cape wagtail, Motacilla capensis
Mountain wagtail, Motacilla clara
African pied wagtail, Motacilla aguimp (A)
African pipit, Anthus cinnamomeus
Mountain pipit, Anthus hoeschi
Nicholson's pipit, Anthus nicholsoni
Plain-backed pipit, Anthus leucophrys (A)
Buffy pipit, Anthus vaalensis
Yellow-tufted pipit, Anthus crenatus
Yellow-breasted pipit, Hemimacronyx chloris (S)
Orange-throated longclaw, Macronyx capensis

Finches, euphonias, and allies
Order: PasseriformesFamily: Fringillidae

Finches are seed-eating passerine birds that are small to moderately large and have a strong beak, usually conical and in some species very large. All have twelve tail feathers and nine primaries. These birds have a bouncing flight with alternating bouts of flapping and gliding on closed wings, and most sing well.

Yellow-fronted canary, Crithagra mozambicus (A)
Black-throated canary, Crithagra atrogularis
Brimstone canary, Crithagra sulphuratus (A)
Yellow canary, Crithagra flaviventris
White-throated canary, Crithagra albogularis
Streaky-headed seedeater, Crithagra gularis
Drakensberg siskin, Crithagra symonsi
Cape canary, Serinus canicollis
Black-headed canary, Serinus alario

Old World buntings
Order: PasseriformesFamily: Emberizidae

The emberizids are a large family of passerine birds. They are seed-eating birds with distinctively shaped bills. Many emberizid species have distinctive head patterns.

Golden-breasted bunting, Emberiza flaviventris (A)
Cape bunting, Emberiza capensis
Lark-like bunting, Emberiza impetuani (A)
Cinnamon-breasted bunting, Emberiza tahapisi

See also
List of birds
Lists of birds by region

References

External links
Birds of Lesotho - World Institute for Conservation and Environment

Lesotho
Lesotho
birds
Lesotho